Cherry Ridge may refer to:

 Cherry Ridge Township, Wayne County, Pennsylvania
 Cherry Ridge (Colchester, Delaware County, New York)
 Cherry Ridge (Hancock, Delaware County, New York)